The Yarra River or historically, the Yarra Yarra River, (Kulin languages: Berrern, Birr-arrung, Bay-ray-rung, Birarang, Birrarung, and Wongete) is a perennial river in south-central Victoria, Australia.

The lower stretches of the Yarra are where Victoria's state capital Melbourne was established in 1835, and today metropolitan Greater Melbourne dominates and influences the landscape of its lower reaches.

The river has been a major food source and meeting place for Indigenous Australians for thousands of years. Shortly after the arrival of European settlers, land clearing forced the remaining Wurundjeri people into neighbouring territories and away from the river. Originally called Birrarung by the Wurundjeri, the current name was mistranslated from another Wurundjeri term in the Boonwurrung language; Yarro-yarro, meaning  "ever-flowing".

The river was utilised primarily for agriculture by early European settlers. The landscape of the river has changed dramatically since 1835.  The course has been progressively disrupted and the river widened in places. The first of many crossings of the Yarra River to facilitate transport was built in Princes Bridge.  Beginning with the Victorian gold rush it was extensively mined, creating the Pound Bend Tunnel in Warrandyte, and the Big and Little Peninsula Tunnels above Warburton.  Widening and dams, like the Upper Yarra Reservoir have helped protect Melbourne from major flooding.  The catchment's upper reaches are also affected by logging. Industrialisation ultimately led to the destruction of the marshlands at the confluence of the Yarra and Maribyrnong Rivers in the area around Coode Island in West Melbourne.

Today, the Yarra mouth including Swanson and Appleton docks are used for container shipping by the Port of Melbourne, which is the busiest on the continent. The city reach which is inaccessible to larger watercrafts, has seen increased use for both transport and recreational boating (including kayaking, canoeing, rowing and swimming). In March 2019, it was reported that the river's environmental health is at risk due to litter, pollution, pets and urban development.

The annual Moomba festival celebrates the Yarra River's increasing cultural significance to Melbourne. Melbourne Water is the lead agency for implementing the Yarra Strategic Plan (Burndap Birrarung Burndap Unmarkoo) 2022-32. The plan gives effect to the community's long-term vision for the Yarra and supports collaborative management of the river and its lands.

Etymology
The river was called Birrarung by the Wurundjeri people who occupied the Yarra Valley and much of Central Victoria prior to European colonisation. It is thought that Birrarung is derived  either from a Wurundjeri words meaning "ever flowing". or 'river of mists'.

Upon European arrival it was given the name 'Yarra Yarra' by John Helder Wedge of the Port Phillip Association in 1835, in the mistaken belief that this was the name for the river in the Boonwurrung language. However it is believed that 'Yarra' means "waterfall", "flow", or refers to running or falling water, descriptive of any river or creek in the area, not just the Yarra. The name Yarra Yarra is said to mean "ever flowing river", but most likely refers to the Yarra Yarra falls which were later dynamited. Of their contact with local Wurunderi people in 1835, John Wedge wrote:

Geology and formation

Before 8000 BC, the Yarra River probably joined course with other present-day Port Phillip Bay tributaries such as the Patterson, Kororoit, Werribee, Little River, and drained directly through a narrow gap (what is now called the Rip) into a bay of the Great Australian Bight on the west side of a prehistoric land bridge called the Bassian Plain (which later became submerged into the Bass Strait).

A dry period combined with sand bar formation may have dried out the Bay as recently as between 800 BC and 1000 AD, temporarily re-extending the Yarra south to Bass Strait during this period.

History

The area surrounding the Yarra River was first inhabited by the Boonwurrung and Wurundjeri peoples of the Kulin nation. The area has been occupied by various indigenous clans for at least 30,000 years. The river, known to the Wurundjeri people as Birrarung, was an important resource for the Wurundjeri people and several sites along the river and its tributaries were important meeting places where corroborees were held between Indigenous communities. The river's resources were utilised sustainably by the Wurundjeri until the arrival of European colonists in the early-mid-19th century.

European discovery and colonisation

The first Europeans to sail up the river was a surveying party led by Charles Grimes, Acting Surveyor General of New South Wales, who in 1803 sailed upstream to Dights Falls, where they could no longer continue due to the nature of the terrain. European explorers would not enter the river for another 30 years until, in 1835, the area that is now central and northern Melbourne was explored by John Batman, a leading member of the Port Phillip Association, who negotiated a transaction for 600,000 acres (2,400 km2) of land from eight Wurundjeri elders. He selected a site on the northern bank of the Yarra River, declaring that "this will be the place for a village". The document, commonly called Batman's Treaty, was declared void by the Governor of New South Wales, Richard Bourke.

The Port Phillip settlement, that would become Melbourne, was established along the lower banks of the Yarra in 1835. The new settlement's main port was sited just downstream of Yarra Falls west of modern-day Queen's Bridge, the place where saltwater met freshwater. Ships would use one side of the falls while the other side provided fresh drinking water for the town and a convenient sewer. In the city's early days the Yarra was one of two major ports, the other being Sandridge (now Port Melbourne), but the Yarra was preferred due to the direct access to the town's main streets and was the location of Customs House (now the Immigration Museum). Early industries grew along the banks of the river, rapidly degrading the water quality. Industries then began using the river and tributaries such as Merri Creek as landfill and for harmful chemical dumps for substances like grease and oils.

The disposal of sewerage in Melbourne was very basic in the early days. The majority of waste from homes and industries flowed into street channels and on to local rivers and creeks which became open sewers. The first City Baths were opened in 1860. The objective was to stop people bathing in the Yarra River, which by the 1850s had become quite polluted and the cause of an epidemic of typhoid fever, which hit the city resulting in many deaths. However, people continued to swim and drink the water until Melbourne's fresh water was sourced from elsewhere.

The first permanent crossing over the river was Princes Bridge, which first opened as a wooden trestle bridge in 1844. The current bridge was constructed in 1888. In the early days, the river would frequently flood. While this was not considered a problem in the floodplains near Yarra Glen and Coldstream, the floodings caused much trouble further downstream in settlements such as Warrandyte, Templestowe, Bulleen, Heidelberg and Ivanhoe. The Upper Yarra Dam was later constructed to alleviate the flooding, protecting settlements along the river, yet depriving the river banks of soil and silt deposits and causing other problems such as erosion and salinity.

Victorian Gold Rush

Gold was first discovered in Victoria near the Yarra River in Warrandyte. The find was made by Louis Michel in 1851 at a tributary of the river, Anderson's Creek and marked the start of the Victorian gold rush. The approximate location of the site is marked by a cairn on Fourth Hill in the Warrandyte State Park. The river was drained and diverted in various areas throughout the gold rush to aid gold miners. An example of this is the tunnel at Pound Bend in Warrandyte. The river was partially dammed at Pound Bend near Normans Reserve at its eastern entrance and near Bob's wetlands at its western exit. Miners then blasted a 145m long tunnel through solid rock. The river was then fully dammed at the entrance and exit to the tunnel and water was diverted through 145m and out the other side leaving a 3.85 km of riverbed around Pound Bend exposed to the sun and the miners picks.  Other diversions include The Island cutting in Warrandyte and the Little Peninsula Tunnel and Big Peninsula Tunnel near McMahons Creek.

The Gold Rush saw increased development in Melbourne and "tent cities" of new migrants lined the Yarra during the early years of the gold rush. In the 1840s a weir was built at Dights Falls to power a flour mill and to give some control over the river downstream from there. From the earliest years of settlement, the mid and upper reaches of the Yarra began to be used for recreation. The river was selected as the site for the Royal Botanic Gardens in 1846 and the course of the river was modified slightly for the creation of a feature lake. Further upstream, the Cremorne Gardens were established in 1853.

Industrialisation

Sections of the river mouth and the area around the former West Melbourne Swamp were widened in the late 19th century, to make way for docks, harbours, bridges and other infrastructure. The increasing industrialisation of the river and the growth of the shipping industry saw the need for major infrastructure works which dramatically changed the course of the river in its lower reaches. The creation of new shipping channels to cope with the growing use of the Yarra by cargo ships was first tabled in the 1870s.

The first major change came with the cutting of the Coode Canal between 1880 and 1886. This major infrastructure project created an island which was known as Coode Island, named after the British consultant engineer engaged to design the works, Sir John Coode. This also included widening and deepening, and in some cases, vast areas of land were excavated, such as Victoria Dock, in order to give ease of access for cargo and later container ships. Abattoirs, smelters and even mortuaries were to use the river as a means of waste disposal in its lower reaches. This industrialisation also led to a steady deterioration in water quality during the 19th century and into the 20th.

The dock was later renamed Victoria Dock. In 1910, the main channel was widened and deepened. In 1916, the central pier at Victoria Dock was completed which provided 6 additional shipping berths and cargo sheds and creating a distinctive landmark for Melbourne ports. By 1942, 650m of the old course of the Yarra River at Coode Island had been filled in, by the 1950s it had been completely filled and land parcels were allocated including a site for the new Fish Markets.

In 1957, the Upper Yarra Reservoir was constructed, primarily to alleviate flooding downstream. This reduced the river's flow to around 50%, where it sits today. Swanson Dock was constructed between 1966 and 1972 equipped for modern container shipping. Shipping activity at Victoria Dock during this time had gone into steep decline and it was almost disused by the mid-1970s. In February 1972, the CBD was flooded as the natural watercourse of Elizabeth Street became a raging torrent. This was due mostly to previous storm water drainage works which utilised Elizabeth street as a watercourse during times of intense rain creating flash floods. Prior to settlements, the area now occupied by Elizabeth street was a gully off the river.

Recent history

By the 1960s there was a growing awareness of the neglect of the Yarra amongst some residents of Melbourne, spawning various community groups and "friends of..." organisations to protect the remnants of the river's ecology. Through the 1970s and 1980s, many desirable developments alongside the river began, such as the Victorian Arts Centre, as its lower courses progressively became gentrified. Growing high density residential development in the lower reaches in the early 1990s coincided with minor government programs such as the installation of litter traps. The riverside apartment complex Como Centre at South Yarra and the larger urban renewal of the formerly industrial Southbank precinct were both built during the late 1990s. During this era it was also commonplace for the winner of the Australian Open to bathe in the Yarra River as a post victory celebration. On the southern side of the river near exists a number of university and private school rowing clubs who use the river for recreational sports.

Around 2000, the river became a focus of major government projects. Projects were proposed to connect Flinders Street station with the river and early proposals were for the Melbourne Museum to be situated on the south bank of the river; however the Crown Melbourne and Melbourne Convention & Exhibition Centre were built in its place. The Melbourne Docklands urban renewal project began in 2000, comprising mixed use residential and commercial land and recreational boating moors along the river at the disused Victoria Dock and on the south bank of the Yarra. Federation Square was proposed to connect the spine of Melbourne to the Yarra at Federation Wharf and a neighbouring park, Birrarung Marr was also built along the north bank, creating renewed interest in connecting city workers to the river. New ferry services and water taxis sprang up along the city reach, servicing as far up river as South Yarra and out to Hobsons Bay.

In 2008, dredging began to deepen the mouth of the Yarra to enable large container ships to reach the Port of Melbourne. The project was controversial and strict regulations were enacted. It was feared that dredging would disturb heavy metals and other toxic sediments mostly deposited during Melbourne's industrial era. The project was completed in November 2009.

Pollution and environmental issues

The Yarra River was an important resource for the Wurundjeri people for around 40,000 years. The river's resources were utilised sustainably by the Wurundjeri until European settlement in the early-mid-19th century. Early industry located along the river contributed great amounts of pollution such as dangerous chemicals, grease, oil and heavy metals. Through the mid-20th century, industry was slowly relocated away from the river and since then the major pollutants have come from storm water runoff, sewerage and lasting effects of previous pollution. Gold mining cleared small areas of land of vegetation and for periods of time, drained sections of the river; however, when compared to land clearing and industrial pollutants, the effects of gold mining on the river were quite low.

Heavy metals deposited into the river throughout the late 19th and early 20th centuries settled to the bottom of the river bed, particularly in the lower reaches through the city and Port Melbourne, and due to the increased artificial depth of the river through here, heavy metals have not been carried further, although some have been deposited out into Port Phillip. Oils and grease remain today in several tributaries in the lower reaches such as Merri Creek and Moonee Ponds Creek.

Pollution
Levels of bacteria, particularly E. coli and substances like grease, oils and heavy metals in the Yarra River and its tributaries are a major problem.

High levels of E. coli, some up to 200 times the safe limit in its tributaries, are caused primarily by poorly maintained septic systems.

Up to 350,000 cigarette butts enter the Yarra catchment storm water runoff every day, these serve as just a small representation of the rubbish and litter that are disposed of in storm water runoff areas that eventually make their way into the river and consequently, the sea.

Some industrial companies continue to use the Yarra as a dumping ground. For example, in recent years paper company Amcor has been fined several times by EPA Victoria for polluting the Yarra and environs. In 2007 it was fined 5,000 for discharging paper pulp into the Yarra from its Alphington plant and in 2008 the company was convicted for releasing oil into the Yarra from its Alphington plant and fined A$80,000.

Several programs are being implemented to minimise beach and river pollution, mostly organised by community groups, EPA Victoria and local councils.

In 2015, a facility for washing down cars and chemical containers illegally leaked toxic chemicals and herbicides into Yarra River, killing trees and endangering public safety. The facility was situated inside Warrandyte State Park, from where the spillover until June 2015 flowed into the river and downstream towards Melbourne.

Lack of flooding
Due to damming and the lack of natural flooding, much of the surrounding vegetation is lacking in the silt and soil deposits that would otherwise be provided by the floods. The construction of the Upper Yarra Reservoir in 1957 reduced the river's flow by around 50%. This has ultimately led to a lack of healthy understory and saplings, or a lack of saplings completely, which contributes to problems such as reduced habitat, erosion and salinity, issues that ironically affect surrounding agriculture.

Water colour

The Yarra River is colloquially known as "the upside down river", for its golden hue. The muddy brown colour is caused by the easily eroded clay soils of its catchment area. The water was clear at the time of the first European settlements, but intensive land clearing and development since the mid-19th century has resulted in the presence of microscopic clay particles. The particles are kept suspended by the turbulence in some parts of the middle and lower sections of the river. When the river water combines with marine salts as it enters Port Phillip, the suspended particles clump together and sink. The presence of clay particles is not a major factor in the pollution of the river.

Environmental advocacy
The Yarra Riverkeeper Association is the largest of many advocacy groups dedicated to protecting the Yarra River and its environs for current and future generations. They are part of the global Waterkeeper Alliance movement and have been involved in forums and discussions pushing for policies to ensure that "the voice" of the river is heard. The Yarra Riverkeeper Association or YRKA for short view the Yarra River as Melbourne's greatest natural asset and educate that its preservation and restoration is vital in helping Melbourne become a sustainable city. Since its establishment in 2004, YRKA has delivered hundreds of presentations and lectures, been in over 200 media appearances and provide on-water inspection tours to over 200 community leaders, business leaders, and politicians. It has had successful campaigns in pushing for great environmental flows and in 2010 the Riverkeeper Ian Penrose was awarded the 2010 Melbourne Award for contribution to the environment.

Geography

The Yarra River has a detailed and complex geological history, see "Geology". It was utilised and managed sustainably by the Wurundjeri for around 40,000 years; however, since the European settlement and use of the river in the mid-19th century, its geography has changed substantially reflecting the unsustainable use of the river and surrounding resources. The river is fed by a number of small unnamed creeks and streams in the Yarra Ranges as well as 49 named tributaries, most of which are creeks. The river's lower reaches travel through central Melbourne. It is the most westerly snow fed river in Australia.

Tributaries and geographic features

The Yarra's major tributaries are the Maribyrnong River, Moonee Ponds Creek, Merri Creek, Darebin Creek, Plenty River, Mullum Mullum Creek and Olinda Creek. The river hosts many geographical features such as; bends, rapids, lakes, islands, floodplains, billabongs and wetlands. Most features have been named after translated Wurundjeri phrases or have European, particularly British, origins. Some of the river's more prominent features include; Coode Island and Fishermans Bend, Victoria Harbour, Herring Island, Yarra Bend, Dights Falls, Upper Yarra Dam and Reservoir and many river flats and billabongs.

Settlements

Greater Melbourne – 4.64 million
Melbourne City Centre – 20,500
South Yarra – 18,000
Richmond – 22,500
Hawthorn – 20,000
Fairfield – 5,000
Heidelberg – 5,300
Bulleen – 10,500
Templestowe – 16,500
Eltham – 17,600
Warrandyte – 10,000
Yarra Glen – 2,600
Healesville – 6,500
Woori Yallock – 2,800
Launching Place – 2,600
Yarra Junction – 1,700
Warburton – 2,300
McMahons Creek – 282

Marine ecology
The river is home to several species of fish. In the lower reaches of the Yarra mainly southern black bream and jellyfish and in the upper reaches smaller quantities of European perch (redfin), Macquarie perch, brown trout, Murray cod and freshwater catfish.  However almost all of the fish are contaminated with heavy metals including arsenic and not fit for human consumption.  Dolphins have been known to venture upstream as far as South Yarra, and serve as an example of the increased salinity of the river's lower reaches. Platypus are rarely seen as far downstream as Fairfield.

Course

Upper reaches

The river's source is a series of swamps in the upper reaches of the Yarra Ranges National Park, directly to the west of the Mount Baw Baw plateau, a thickly forested subalpine park, which is entirely closed-off to all except the employees of Melbourne Water. The park features extensive stands of mountain ash, a very tall eucalypt, tree ferns, as well as patches of remnant rainforest.

The Upper Yarra Dam, one of a number of dams in the Yarra Catchment that supply a large part of Melbourne's water, is the furthest upstream point on the river visible to the general public (though the dam itself is closed off). The first settlement the still-young river passes through is the small town of Reefton, but most of the river is surrounded by hills covered temperate forest until the timber and resort town of Warburton. The Woods Point Rd follows the river through this section.

Downstream of Warburton, the Yarra Valley gradually opens out and farms begin to appear, including beef and dairy farms, and by the town of Woori Yallock and the river's turn north, increasingly large areas are covered by vineyards, forming the Yarra Valley wine region. At Healesville, the river turns west again and the stream bed becomes increasingly silty, reducing the clarity of the water, and by the commuter town of Yarra Glen it begins to take on the brownish colour that the lower reaches are known for.

Middle reaches

The river enters Melbourne's suburbs proper at Chirnside Park, but virtually all the river's length is surrounded by parkland, much retaining (or having been replanted with) extensive native vegetation. A bicycle and walking trail known as the Main Yarra Trail begins at Warrandyte and becomes the Yarra River Trail, and in the lower reaches, the Capital City Trail. The river is used extensively for kayaking at Templestowe, and canoes can often be seen throughout the suburban section. Whilst the water is not particularly clear, its quality is sufficient for edible fish to swim within it. Some small hobby farms are located in the floodplain area of the river, surprisingly close to central Melbourne and almost completely surrounded by suburbs.

Heidelberg formed the home of the Heidelberg School, widely considered the first European painters to accurately capture the Australian landscape and its distinctive features. The walking trail features placards displaying some of their paintings at the settings they were actually painted; some features depicted remain clearly recognisable today.

Lower reaches

Below Dights Falls at Yarra Bend Park in inner Melbourne, the river becomes increasingly estuarine as it passes along the southern side of the central business district. This area forms the venue for the annual "Moomba" festival, which notably features an annual water skiing competition which attracts a huge crowd. The lower stretch of the river from Docklands to the Melbourne Cricket Ground was part of the final path of the Queen's Baton Relay of the 2006 Commonwealth Games. Many of Melbourne's private schools, located close to the river, train their rowing crews on it.

The lower reaches feature a number of boat cruises, using especially low-roof boats to go under the many bridges across this section of the Yarra. Herring Island is a small island at South Yarra which has a punt which takes people on to the park. The area in front of old Customs House is a former turning basin for ships. It is the point which was once known as "Freshwater Place" and once had a set of cascades which prevented both salt water and larger ships from going further upstream. This series of rocks, originally used to cross the river, and referred to as the "Yarra Falls" was removed using explosives and divers in 1883.

The final section passes through the Port of Melbourne and under the Bolte Bridge and the West Gate Bridge. The current course dates back to 1886 when a canal devised by British engineer Sir John Coode was cut from west of Flinders Street to below its junction with the Maribyrnong. The resulting island between the new and old courses of the river was named Coode Island, and is now part of the mainland with the former course to the north filled in. The river flows into Port Phillip, the site being extensively altered as part of the Port of Melbourne, Australia's busiest seaport.

Crossings

Since the first permanent crossing was built over the river in 1844, there are now over 60 places where pedestrians, cars and other vehicles can cross the river. As the river is never wider than around 350m and is on average only around 50m wide, most of the crossings are located in the suburbs of Greater Melbourne. While there are fewer crossings towards the mouth of the river, most notably the West Gate, Bolte and Princes Bridges, and the Burnley and Domain Tunnels. Small historical bridges can be found further downstream including the Banksia Street, Fitzsimons Lane and Warrandyte Bridges. Beyond Warburton there are very few crossings available. Some of the more prominent and historical crossings include;
West Gate Bridge – 1978
Bolte Bridge – 1999
Sandridge Bridge – 1888
Princes Bridge – 1844, 1850, 1888
CityLink Tunnels – 1997
Morell Bridge – 1899
Johnston Street Bridge – 1858
Warrandyte Bridge – 1861, 1952

Parklands

Several reserves have been set aside adjoining the Yarra, mostly to preserve the natural environment or for recreation, many of these are managed and operated by Parks Victoria, the state government agency responsible for the management of Victoria's national parks and other reserves. The largest and most notable of these parklands include: the Royal Botanic Gardens, Birrarung Marr, Yarra Bend Park, Westerfolds Park, Warrandyte State Park and the Yarra Ranges National Park.

Major parks
Some of the larger parklands adjoining the river include, from downstream to upstream:
 Birrarung Marr
 Royal Botanic Gardens
 Yarra Bend Park
 Westerfolds Park
 Warrandyte State Park
 Yarra Ranges National Park

Golf courses
There are 14 golf courses adjoining the river, these include, from downstream to upstream:
 Burnley Golf Course (9)
 Studley Park Golf Course (9)
 Yarra Bend Public Golf Course (18)
 Latrobe Golf Course (18)
 Green Acres Golf Club (18)
 Kew Golf Club (18)
 Ivanhoe Public Golf Course (18)
 Freeway Public Golf Course (18)
 Yarra Valley Country Club (9)
 Bulleen Driving Range
 Rosanna Golf Club (18)
 The Heritage Golf and Country Club
 Henly Course (18)
 St. John Course (18)
 Warburton Golf Club (18)

Popular culture

The Yarra is considered an important part of Melbourne's culture and a symbol of the city, and as a result, it has been the source of artistic and cultural expression.
The Yarra has been captured in many famous paintings including some by the Heidelberg School.
The annual Moomba festival celebrates the Yarra River's increasing cultural significance to Melbourne.
The river has featured in songs by the Whirling Furphies, titled "My Brown Yarra", and the Coodabeen Champions, titled "By the Banks of the Yarra".
A poem entitled "Yara Yara" was written by Greek poet Nikos Kavvadias in 1951.
A song entitled The Yarra Song was written by Billy Bragg and included on the Australian edition of his 2002 album, England, Half English.

Recreational use

Throughout its length, the waters of the Yarra River and its banks are used for; boating, rowing, water skiing, kayaking, canoeing, swimming, fishing, cycling, running and walking, amongst other things. In the rivers upper reaches, fishing is most popular. Upstream of Launching Place the river becomes quite narrow and recreational use is limited. In the middle reaches, canoeing and kayaking is popular, there are a few rapids of easy to medium difficulty depending on the water level.

Swimming is also popular in the middle reaches throughout winter, particularly around Warrandyte. Around this area there are submerged mining shafts which can cause undertows that suck swimmers under the surface and into these shafts. In the period 2004–08, 3 people died in this manner in Warrandyte alone. Swimming is safer downstream, but not advisable below Dights Falls due to the high levels of pollution and high boating traffic. The Yarra River once held the world's largest swimming event, the Race to Prince's Bridge. The 3 Mile course ran in the lower reaches, from Twickenham Ferry (now MacRobertson Bridge) to Princes Bridge. The race often attracted greater than 500 competitors and large numbers of onlookers seeking to experience the spectacle.

In the lower reaches, the river is mostly used for rowing, there are several rowing sheds along the city stretch east of the Princes Bridge and many private schools have rowing clubs with sheds and berths on the river. At certain times of the year, particularly during the Moomba Festival, this stretch of the river is occupied by water skiing courses and jumps. The banks of the Yarra River are popular for cycling, running and walking where most paths are sealed and in good condition. Two major off-road, sealed trails, the Yarra River Trail and Capital City Trail follow the river on its course through the city, while part of the Bayside Trail also connects with the river.

The river is also popular for boating, in the residential suburb of Toorak some of the larger mansions have private boat moorings, whilst newer developments in Melbourne Docklands have larger marinas as does Pier 31 at Fisherman's Bend and Newport and Williamstown at the river's mouth. Boating is difficult beyond Hawthorn and impossible past Dights Falls. It is mostly concentrated in central Melbourne where cruises go up and down the river and ferries operate.

Navigation 
The river can be used by any member of the public provided they abide by the rules of Parks Victoria who administer the river upstream of Bolte Bridge and the Port of Melbourne Corporation who administer the area downstream of Bolte Bridge. Sections of the river are occasionally closed for public events such as Moomba, New Year's Eve and Rowing events.

There are four bridges on the Yarra River with limited height clearances at high tide:
 Charles Grimes Bridge – 
 Kings Bridge – 
 Queens Bridge –

See also

 Crossings of the Yarra River
 Geography of the Yarra River
 Geology of Victoria
 Lakes and Reservoirs in Melbourne
 Parklands adjoining the Yarra River
Brushy Creek (Melbourne)
 Yarra Ranges National Park
 Yarra Valley

References

Further reading
 
 

Melbourne Water catchment
Rivers of Greater Melbourne (region)
Port of Melbourne
Landmarks in Melbourne